Libby, previously known as Easport, is an unincorporated community on Coalbank Slough in Coos County, Oregon, United States. It was named for a Native American woman. Its post office was established on June 11, 1890, and operated for just two years. Enoch Gore was postmaster.

Libby lies along Libby Road west of U.S. Route 101 and slightly south of the city of Coos Bay. Coalbank Slough flows generally north into Coos Bay.

References

Unincorporated communities in Coos County, Oregon
1890 establishments in Oregon
Populated places established in 1890
Unincorporated communities in Oregon